Rafael Gallardo García (28 October 1927 – 30 January 2021) was a Mexican Roman Catholic bishop.

Gallardo García was born in Yuriria and ordained to the priesthood in 1950. He served as bishop of the Roman Catholic Diocese of Linares, Mexico, from 1974 to 1987 and as bishop of the Roman Catholic Diocese of Tampico, Mexico, from 1987 to 2003.

Notes

1927 births
2021 deaths
People from Guanajuato
21st-century Roman Catholic bishops in Mexico
20th-century Roman Catholic bishops in Mexico